Domenico Morone ( 1442 – 1518) was an Italian painter from Verona, painting in an early Renaissance style. Much of his work has not survived, notably his fresco cycles. He was considered by Vasari to be second only to Liberale da Verona among artists in his town. His son Francesco Morone was also a prominent Veronese painter. His pupils included Michele da Verona and Girolamo dai Libri.

Domenico Morone is known from a few panels, mainly depicting public festivals or tournaments with crowds of small figures. One of his masterpieces is the canvas celebrating the Cacciata dei Bonacolsi (1494) (or Expulsion of the Bonacolsi in 1328, scene of Piazza Sordello, Mantua) in the Ducal Palace of Mantua. Two small cassone panels depicting the Rape of Sabine women dated to c.1490 and attributed to Morone were bought by the National Gallery, London in 1886 and remain in its collections.  He was particularly prolific at the church of San Bernardino, Verona, painting a Madonna for the shutters of its organ (acquired with the Edward Solly collection by Berlin State Museums) and producing the frescoes for its chapel of Sant' Antonio, as well as leading the project to fresco its Franciscan library, with several of the central library frescoes painted by Morone himself.

References

1440s births
1518 deaths
15th-century Italian painters
Italian male painters
16th-century Italian painters
Painters from Verona
Italian Renaissance painters